A Traditional Christmas is a Christmas album by country music artist Joe Nichols. It was released in 2004 on Show Dog-Universal Music. The record is Nichols' first album of Christmas music, and was also his second release in the year 2004. It consists of ten renditions of traditional Christmas tunes.

Track listing

Personnel
Lisa Cochran - background vocals
Shannon Forrest - drums
Wes Hightower - background vocals
Jim Hoke - accordion, autoharp, clarinet, harmonica, recorder, soprano saxophone, tin whistle
David Hungate - upright bass
Gordon Mote - organ, piano, synthesizer
Joe Nichols - lead vocals
Brent Rowan - electric guitar, keyboards
Bryan Sutton - acoustic guitar, hi-string guitar, soloist

Chart performance

References

2004 Christmas albums
Joe Nichols albums
Show Dog-Universal Music albums
Albums produced by Brent Rowan
Christmas albums by American artists
Country Christmas albums